Battle of the Rhyndacus River or Battle of the Rhyndacus can refer to one of several battles fought near the Rhyndacus River in modern Turkey: 

 Battle of the Rhyndacus (85 BC), during the First Mithridatic War between Mithridates VI of Pontus and the Romans under Flavius Fimbria
 Battle of the Rhyndacus (72 BC), during the Third Mithridatic War between Mithridates VI of Pontus and the Romans under Lucullus
 Battle of the Rhyndacus (1211), between the Nicaean Greeks under Theodore I and the Latin Empire under Henry of Flanders